Gillian Mary White (1936-2016, married name Fraser) was an English lawyer and professor of law. She was professor of international law at the University of Manchester from 1975 until her retirement in 1991. She was the first English woman to be appointed as a professor of law in the United Kingdom, and the first woman to hold such a post in mainland Britain (South African Claire Palley having been appointed professor of law at Queen's University Belfast in 1970).

Selected publications

References

1936 births
2016 deaths
20th-century English lawyers
English women lawyers
English women non-fiction writers
20th-century English women writers